HMS Plymouth was a 52-gun third-rate frigate, built for the navy of the Commonwealth of England and launched at Wapping in 1653. By 1677 her armament had been increased to 60 guns.

Plymouth was rebuilt at Blackwall Yard in 1705 as a 60-gun fourth-rate ship of the line. She sunk later that year and was lost.

Notes

References
Lavery, Brian (2003) The Ship of the Line - Volume 1: The development of the battlefleet 1650-1850. Conway Maritime Press. .

Ships of the line of the Royal Navy
1650s ships
Ships built in Wapping
Speaker-class ships of the line